A kunoichi is a female ninja.

Kunoichi may also refer to:

Media
Kunoichi (TV series), a Japanese sports entertainment show known as Women of Ninja Warrior in English
Kunoichi (video game), a Japanese video game also known as Nightshade in English
The Kunoichi: Ninja Girl, a Japanese film also known as The Kunoichi: Ninja Girl in English
"Kunoichi", a song by GO!GO!7188 from the album Ryūzetsuran
"Kunoichi", a song by Afrirampo from the album A'

Fictional characters
Kunoichi, a playable character in the Samurai Warriors video game series, also appearing in the Warriors Orochi crossover series
Kunoichi, a player character in the video games The Ninja Warriors and The Ninja Warriors Again
Kunoichi, a playable character in the video game Mini Ninjas
Kunoichi, a character in the anime series Yoshimune

Other uses
Iga FC Kunoichi, a Japanese women's football club

See also
 Ninja (disambiguation)
 Ninja Warrior (disambiguation)
 Shinobi (disambiguation)